The Kadriorg Stadium is a multi-purpose stadium in Tallinn, Estonia. Opened in 1926, it is one of the oldest stadiums in Estonia. It is currently used mostly for track and field competitions, but also serves as a home ground for JK Tallinna Kalev. The stadium holds 5,000. The Kadriorg Stadium is located about 2 km east of the city centre in the subdistrict of Kadriorg near the Kadriorg Palace. The address of the stadium is Roheline aas 24, 10150 Tallinn.

Before 2001 when the A. Le Coq Arena was built, Kadriorg was the home ground for the Estonia national football team. In total, the stadium hosted 66 Estonia national team football matches. Throughout its history, the Kadriorg Stadium has at some point been the home ground for nearly all of the top-flight football teams of Tallinn, such as FC Flora, Levadia, Kalev, Nõmme Kalju, TJK Legion and TVMK.

Kadriorg Stadium has hosted the European Athletics U23 Championships in 2015 and 2021, as well as the European Athletics U20 Championships in 2011 and 2021. It was also one of the venues for the 2012 UEFA European U19 Championship.

History 
Kadriorg Stadium was opened on 13 June 1926, eight years after Estonia had become independent. The stadium's opening event took place in front of 15,000 spectators and saw Estonia beat Lithuania 3–1 in football. The first grandstand was designed by architect Karl Burman. 

On 15 May 1938, a new and bigger concrete grandstand was opened with great celebration by Konstantin Päts. The opening event saw Estonia draw 1–1 with RC Strasbourg in front of 8,000 people. A year later, World War II had reached Estonia and the country was occupied by the Soviet Union, after which Kadriorg Stadium was renamed as Dünamo staadion. 

In 1992, the stadium hosted the first Estonia national football team's match after the country's re-independence, when Estonia drew 1–1 with Slovenia. It was also the location of the infamous "One team in Tallinn" fixture between Estonia and Scotland, which was abandoned after three seconds when the home team refused to turn up, in protest at the game's kick-off time being brought forward several hours.

The national team's last match in Kadriorg took place on 3 September 2000 against Portugal, after which the team moved to A. Le Coq Arena. In total, Kadriorg Stadium hosted 66 Estonia national football team matches.

In 2011, Kadriorg Stadium hosted the 21st European Athletics Junior Championships. The stadium was one of the venues for the 2012 UEFA European U19 Championship and hosted three group stage matches. In 2015, the stadium hosted the U23 European Athletics Championships. In 2021, Kadriorg hosted both U20 and U23 European Athletics Championships.

By 2026, when the stadium will celebrate its 100th birthday, the Kadriorg Stadium is planned to undergo a major renovation, which is to cost 12 million euros.

Grandstand 

Kadriorg Stadium's current grandstand was built in 1938 and is an official cultural heritage monument. Designed by architect Elmar Lohk and famous engineer August Komendant, the concrete grandstand has also been brought out by world-famous architectural critic Kenneth Frampton as one of the most outstanding and historic concrete structures in Estonia.

Athletics records
Updated on 10 July 2021.

Men

Women

See also
August Komendant

References

External links

Event venues established in 1926
Football venues in Estonia
Sports venues in Tallinn
Multi-purpose stadiums in Estonia
1926 establishments in Estonia
Kesklinn, Tallinn
Athletics (track and field) venues in Estonia
FCI Levadia Tallinn